Hydrogaster is a monotypic genus of flowering plants belonging to the family Malvaceae. It only contains one species, Hydrogaster trinervis Kuhlm. 

Its native range is eastern Brazil.

References

Grewioideae
Malvaceae genera
Flora of Brazil